Gary Alan Seear (19 February 1952 – 8 February 2018) was a New Zealand rugby union player. He captained the 1974 Junior All Blacks. Seear toured South Africa with the 1976 All Blacks but did not make an appearance until the following year where he played at number eight in two tests in France. He made further appearances in the 1978 home series against the Wallabies, the 1979 French tourists side, four more internationals in Britain and the sole test in Australia in 1979. He played in Italy for the Fracasso San Dona club during the 1979 season. He later worked as a commercial property sales consultant for worldwide real estate firm Colliers International in Christchurch.

References

1952 births
2018 deaths
Rugby union players from Dunedin
People educated at Bayfield High School, Dunedin
New Zealand international rugby union players
New Zealand rugby union players
Otago rugby union players
Rugby union locks
Rugby union number eights
New Zealand expatriate sportspeople in Italy
Expatriate rugby union players in Italy